The Supreme Council – Restoration Seimas of the Republic of Lithuania (officially known as Supreme Council of the Republic of Lithuania), was the supreme governing body, elected in 1990. The first meeting was held on 10 March 1990, the last – 11 November 1992.

Powers 
As outlined in the Provisional Basic Law of the Republic of Lithuania (1990), the Supreme Council had the following powers:
to adopt the Constitution of the Republic of Lithuania and amend it
to call for elections for deputies throughout the Republic of Lithuania and to confirm the composition of the Electoral Commission of the Republic
to approve drafts of the basic programmes of economic and social development of the Republic of Lithuania; approval of budget
to regulate property relations of in the Republic
to interpret the laws of the Republic of Lithuania
to form state bodies accountable to the Supreme Council of the Republic of Lithuania; to establish the systems of the procuracy, the Courts and other judicial bodies of the Republic of Lithuania
to elect chairman and vice-chairmen, and Secretary of the Supreme Council
to elect the Supreme Court of Lithuania and judges of regional and city courts, to appoint the Procurator-General of the Republic of Lithuania;
to hold regular hearings, to receive reports by institutions established and elected by the Supreme Council, with the exception of the Supreme Court of Lithuania
when necessary, to issue nonconfidence votes by secret ballot regarding the Executive Branch of the Republic of Lithuania and other institutions formed by the Supreme Council or regarding any of their members, with the exception of the Supreme Court of Lithuania
to establish appropriate measures to guarantee state security and public order
to reapportion the administrative-territorial structure of the Republic of Lithuania
to change the names and status of administrative-territorial units
to consider matters relating to the foreign policy of the Republic of Lithuania; to ratify and renounce international treaties of the Republic
to establish state awards of the Republic of Lithuania
to adopt a decision to hold referendum
to issue acts of amnesty
to repeal directives and decrees of the Executive Branch, as well as decisions of regional councils and municipal councils of the Republic if they conflict with existing legislation
to resolve other significant issues of state

Political activity 
From the outset, the work of the Supreme Council on 11 March 1990, Lithuania adopted the Act of the Re-Establishment of the State of Lithuania. On March 12, the Supreme Council adopted Resolution, that declared USSR universal military service law of 12 October 1967, invalid within the Republic of Lithuania. The council also nationalized all the assets of the USSR, that were located in Lithuania. But just three days later, on 15 March, the Soviet Congress of People's Deputies adopted a resolution, in which restoration of the independence of the Republic of Lithuania was declared null and void. Congress passed this resolution with 1,463 people's deputies voted for, 98 voted against and 128 abstentions.

Economic blockade has suspended the country's economic growth and the foreign states would not recognize the independence of Lithuania. But on 6 September 1991, after failed 1991 Soviet coup d'état attempt, the Soviet federal government has officially recognised independence of Lithuania and other Baltic states, and lifted blockade.

In the first half of 1992, parliament's majority changed. Until the end of 1991, the United Sąjūdis parliamentary group held majority. Its members by late 1991 and early 1992 gradually switched to other parliamentary groups (e. g. Seventh/Moderates' parliamentary group). This led to  the infighting between United Sąjūdis parliamentary group (along with Vagnorius-led government) and so-called the 'New Majority'.

It caused gridlock in the parliament as both groups held their sessions separately or the United Sąjūdis parliamentary group boycotted official ones. On July 9, 1992, Supreme Council voted for the snap elections, which took place on October 25, 1992.

Composition

Chairman

Deputy Chairmen

References

Legal history of Lithuania
Lithuanian constitutional law
1990s in Lithuania
Seimas by legislative term